Ninni Bruschetta (born  Antonino Bruschetta on 6 January 1962) is an Italian actor, film and stage director and  screenwriter.

Life and career 
Born in Messina, in 1983 Bruschetta co-founded with Maurizio Puglisi  "Nutrimenti terrestri", a stage company which  primarily focused on subjects of social value, and was active both as an actor and a director.  In 1987 he debuted as a screenwriter with the indie drama La gentilezza del tocco, and in 1989 he co-directed the indie film Private Screening. He is also very active as an actor in films and television series.

Selected filmography 
Actor
 Libera (1993)
 Law of Courage (1994)
 Black Holes (1995)
 First Light of Dawn (2000)
 One Hundred Steps (2000)
 One Man Up (2001)
 Lost Love (2003)
 The Vanity Serum  (2004)
 The Life That I Want (2004)
 The Man of Glass (2007)
 My Brother Is an Only Child (2007)
 Boris (2007)
 Come Undone (2010)
 Boris: The Film (2011)
 Tell No One (2012)
 Buongiorno papà (2013)
 The Mafia Kills Only in Summer (2013)
 Wannabe Widowed (2013)
 La trattativa (2014)
 Land of Saints (2015)
 Quo Vado? (2016)
 Quel bravo ragazzo (2016)
 Alex & Co: How to Grow Up Despite Your Parents (2016)
 Tuttapposto (2019)

 Screenwriter
 La gentilezza del tocco (1987)
 Private Screening (1989, also director)
 Nessuno (1992)

References

External links 
 

1962 births
Actors from Messina
Italian film directors
Living people
Italian screenwriters
Italian male film actors
Italian male stage actors
Italian male television actors
Film people from the Province of Messina
Italian male screenwriters